The Halsnøy Tunnel is a subsea road tunnel which connects the island of Halsnøy to the mainland in Kvinnherad Municipality in Vestland county in Norway. The northern end of the tunnel is at Sunde, just south of Husnes, and the southern entrance to the tunnel is just north of the village of Sæbøvik on Halsnøy. Located on County Road 500, it opened on 8 March 2008 and is as of May 2019 a toll road. The project included  of new road and cost 427 million Norwegian krone. Prior to the opening of this tunnel in 2008, the island of Halsnøy was the most populous island in Norway with no road connection. As an energy conservation measure, the tunnel is not fully illuminated at night, but rather when a vehicle approaches the tunnel, sensors turn on the lights, and then when all vehicles have exited the tunnel, the lights turn off again.

Initially planned as a tolled tunnel until 2023, it was later confirmed that the toll period would be extended until 2026 due to an increase in electric cars, which are toll-exempt in Norway. In May 2019, however, it was announced that the tunnel would have its remaining debt erased, and would become toll-free starting 6 September 2019, four years earlier than originally planned.

References

Subsea tunnels in Norway
Road tunnels in Vestland
Kvinnherad
2008 establishments in Norway
Tunnels completed in 2008